Matt Ward is a British author and miniature wargaming designer, who is best known for his work with Games Workshop on the Warhammer Fantasy Battles, Warhammer 40,000 and The Lord of the Rings Strategy Battle Game systems. He was also a frequent contributor to the magazine White Dwarf during his time at the company.

In May 2014, Ward left Games Workshop and currently works as a novelist.

Bibliography
 A Matter of Belief (novella, 2014)
 Brazen Dreams (short story, 2015)
 The Bargain (short story, 2015)
 Frostgrave: Second Chances: A Tale of the Frozen City (novel, 2017)
 Legacy of Ash (novel, 2019)
 Legacy of Steel (novel, 2020)
 Legacy of Light (novel, 2021)

Games Workshop
 Army Book: Daemons of Chaos (2008)
 Warhammer 40,000 Rulebook, 5th Edition (2008)
 Codex: Space Marines (2008)
 Codex: Blood Angels (2010)
 Warhammer Fantasy Rulebook, 8th Edition (2010)
 Codex: Grey Knights (2011)
 Army Book: Dark Elves (2012)
 Army Book: Daemons of Chaos (2013)

Video games
 Warhammer: End Times – Vermintide (2015)
 Warhammer: Vermintide 2 (2018)
 Battlefleet Gothic: Armada 2 (2019)
 Warhammer 40,000: Darktide (2022)

References

 Priestley, Rick; et al. (2008). Warhammer 40,000 (5th ed.). Nottingham: Games Workshop. .
 Ward, Matt (2007). Warhammer Armies: Daemons of Chaos (7th Edition ed.). Nottingham: Games Workshop. .
 Ward, Matt. (2010). Codex: Blood Angels. Nottingham: Games Workshop. .
 Ward, Matt. (2011). Codex: Grey Knights. Nottingham: Games Workshop. .
 Ward, Matt. (2008). Codex: Space Marines. Nottingham: Games Workshop. .

Board game designers
Living people
Miniature wargames
Video game writers
Warhammer 40,000 writers
Year of birth missing (living people)